Lensa Indonesia (English: Lens of Indonesia) (stylized in capitals as LINDO) is an Indonesian news programme which is broadcast on RTV. Its slogan is Makin Cakep (More Charming). It debuted at RTV on May 3, 2014. The program broadcast for three to four hours each day through Lensa Indonesia Pagi (breakfast news), Lensa Indonesia Siang (lunchtime news) and Lensa Indonesia Malam (night news).

Controversy 
This news program night edition was sanctioned by the Indonesian Broadcasting Commission (KPI) for showing an uncensored scene of a couple kissing.

References

External links 

 Lensa Indonesia RTV official website

Indonesian television news shows
Indonesian-language television shows
Mass media in Indonesia stubs
Asian television show stubs
2014 Indonesian television series debuts
2010s Indonesian television series
RTV (Indonesian TV network) original programming